Bidwell Hollow is a valley in Ste. Genevieve County the U.S. state of Missouri.

Bidwell Hollow has the name of the Bidwell family, proprietors of a local sawmill.

References

Valleys of Ste. Genevieve County, Missouri
Valleys of Missouri